The 7.62mm UKM [7.62×57mm] is a specialized rimless bottlenecked centerfire cartridge developed for long-range rifles. The commercially successful .338 Lapua Magnum cartridge has functioned as the parent case for the 7.62mm UKM, which is essentially a necked-down shortened version of the .338 Lapua Magnum. The .338 cartridge case was used for this since it has the capability to operate with high chamber pressures which, combined with smaller and hence lighter bullets result in high muzzle velocities.

History
The 7.62mm UKM was developed by Michael Uekötter and C.I.P. (Commission Internationale Permanente pour l'Epreuve des Armes à Feu Portatives) certified in 2002, so it is an officially registered and sanctioned member of the Finnish "family" of super magnum rifle cartridges. The 7.62mm UKM is not commercially available today and currently (2008) exists only as a C.I.P. datasheet. It is however still used by a few shooters who produce the cases from .338 Lapua Magnum brass by reshaping the shoulder and neck, and handloading it with .30 calibre bullets.

Cartridge dimensions
The 7.62mm UKM has a 5.84 ml (90 grains) H2O cartridge case capacity. The exterior shape of the Lapua Magnum case was designed to promote reliable case feeding and extraction in bolt-action rifles and machineguns alike, under extreme conditions.

7.62mm UKM maximum C.I.P. cartridge dimensions. All sizes in millimeters (mm).

Americans would define the shoulder angle at alpha/2 ≈ 20 degrees. The common rifling twist rate for this cartridge is 254 mm (1 in 10 in), 6 grooves, Ø lands = 7.62 mm, Ø grooves = 7.82 mm, land width = 2.79 mm and the primer type is large rifle magnum.

According to the official C.I.P. (Commission Internationale Permanente pour l'Epreuve des Armes à Feu Portatives) rulings the 7.62mm UKM can handle up to  Pmax piezo pressure.  This now prevails over the C.I.P. decisions and tables edition 2003, that rated the 7.62mm UKM at  Pmax maximum piezo pressure. In C.I.P. regulated countries every rifle cartridge combo has to be proofed at 125% of this maximum C.I.P. pressure to certify for sale to consumers. This means that 7.62mm UKM chambered arms in C.I.P. regulated countries are currently (2015) proof tested at  PE piezo pressure.

This for rifles very high maximum allowed chamber pressure level indicates that the cases of the .300 and .338 Lapua Magnum and 7.62mm UKM are built extremely sturdy to cope with this for rifles very high operating pressure. The large boltface combined with the high 440 MPa maximum pressure makes that the 7.62mm UKM should only be chambered in rifles that are capable of handling such large and fierce cartridges and thus high bolt thrust safely. Chambering such powerful super magnum cartridges in rifles intended for normal magnum rifle cartridges and using 440 MPa loads can cause serious or fatal injury to the shooter and bystanders.

Additional information
The 7.62 mm UKM’s main appeal is long-range shooting. Due to the large case capacity in relation to the 7.62 mm (.308 inch) calibre bore size the round is harsh on barrels like other .300 Magnum cartridges. In an Austrian based online forum "Leuchtspur.eu" the inventor Michael Uekötter claimed he needed to replace his Krieger custom barrel after more than 4,000 shots with the 7.62 mm UKM. A lot of thorough barrel cleaning (after every 5 to 10 shots) and carefully avoiding long strings of shots help to minimize barrel wear.

The American .300 Dakota proprietary cartridge, based on the .404 Jeffery case, is probably the closest (as of 2008) commercially available ballistic twin of the 7.62 mm UKM. The .300 Dakota is however a rebated rim cartridge.

See also
 List of rifle cartridges
 7 mm caliber
 .300 Lapua Magnum
 .338 Lapua Magnum

References

 C.I.P. CD-ROM edition 2003
 C.I.P. decisions, texts and tables (free current C.I.P. CD-ROM version download (ZIP and RAR format))

External links and sources
 QuickLOAD internal ballistics predictor computer program for fire arms
 C.I.P. TDCC sheet 7,62 UKM

Pistol and rifle cartridges
Magnum rifle cartridges